SS Wakool was a steamship that was built in Sunderland, England in 1898 for the Blue Anchor Line. P&O took over the Blue Anchor Line in 1910 and sold Wakool in 1913 to Japanese buyers who renamed her Kwanto Maru. In 1917 the French government acquired her and renamed her Le Myre de Villers. She was scrapped in La Spezia, Italy in 1925.

References

1898 ships
Ships built on the River Wear
Ships of P&O (company)
Steamships of France
Steamships of Japan
Steamships of the United Kingdom